Sound of Love is a live album by jazz drummer Paul Motian recorded at the Village Vanguard in 1995 and on the Winter & Winter label in 1997. It features Motian in his longtime trio with guitarist Bill Frisell and tenor saxophonist Joe Lovano.

Reception
The Penguin Guide to Jazz selected this album as part of its suggested Core Collection.

The AllMusic review by Stephen Cook awarded the album 4½ stars, calling it "a stellar set of jazz covers and Motian originals" and stating: "As the premium sound quality of the recording makes clear, this trio had an almost telepathic rapport on stage, inspiring each other in both ensemble playing and solo flights. This kind of hand-in-glove chemistry is certainly due in part to the group's many stints on the road, but also comes from the individual player's  styles".

Track listing
All compositions by Paul Motian except as indicated
 "Misterioso" (Thelonious Monk) - 13:24 
 "Duke Ellington's Sound of Love" (Charles Mingus) - 9:09 
 "Mumbo Jumbo" - 7:29 
 "Once Around the Park" - 6:48 
 "Good Morning Heartache" (Irene Higginbotham, Ervin Drake, Dan Fisher) - 8:48 
 "Epistrophy" (Kenny Clarke, Monk) - 7:10 
 "Play" - 6:08 
Recorded at the Village Vanguard in New York City on June 7–10, 1995

Personnel
Paul Motian - drums
Bill Frisell - electric guitar
Joe Lovano - tenor saxophone

References 

1997 live albums
Paul Motian live albums
Winter & Winter Records albums
Albums recorded at the Village Vanguard